The Palestine Human Rights Information Center (PHRIC) was an independent, non-governmental organization based in Jerusalem. PHRIC was established in 1986.

See also
 Al-Haq
 B'Tselem

References

Human rights organizations based in the State of Palestine
Organizations established in 1986
Non-governmental organizations involved in the Israeli–Palestinian conflict